Hunter House is a historic home located near Ridgeway, Fairfield County, South Carolina.  It was built about 1820, and is a -story, "L"-shaped Federal style weatherboarded building on a raised brick basement. It has a gable roof and exterior end chimneys. The five-bay façade features a pedimented porch sheltering the three central bays.

It was added to the National Register of Historic Places in 1984.

References

hunter house was built by Abraham furgeson father-in-law of George Ross hunter who married Abraham's daughter Anita Ferguson 
Anita and George had two sons George and Cyrus William hunger, fought in the civil war and were grandsons of George Ross signer of the Declaration of Independence from Pennsylvania(this info revealed. Y Anita Gutierrez, great-granddaughter of Cyrus William hunter)

Houses on the National Register of Historic Places in South Carolina
Federal architecture in South Carolina
Houses completed in 1820
Houses in Fairfield County, South Carolina
National Register of Historic Places in Fairfield County, South Carolina